Following are the largest impact craters on various worlds of the Solar System.  For a full list of named craters, see List of craters in the Solar System.

See also 
 List of Solar System extremes
 List of largest lakes and seas in the Solar System
 List of largest rifts and valleys in the Solar System
 List of tallest mountains in the Solar System

References

Solar System
Craters, largest in the Solar System
Craters